Chisholm Trail is a video game released in July 1982 by Texas Instruments for its TI-99/4A home computer. It was written by John C. Plaster, who previously wrote Tombstone City: 21st Century for the TI-99/4A.

Gameplay
Players take the role of a cattle driver on the Chisholm Trail, bringing their cattle to set destinations while defending them against cattle rustlers and wranglers. The game has nine levels. You can choose any of the levels from the start menu and the level selected determines how long you have been on the trail, how many steers you have, how many shots you have, and how many wranglers and rustlers must be eliminated. 

Wranglers are in the form of brands and will try to brand the steers for themselves. Mileage counts as the score and Rustlers are worth 250 miles and Wranglers are 150 miles. Every time 10,000 miles is reached another steer is added to the group.

References

External links
 Eli's Software Encyclopedia: Chisholm Trail
 Giant Bomb: Chisholm Trail
 TI-99/4A Video Game House: Chisholm Trail
 TI-99/4A-Pedia: Chisholm Trail

1982 video games
Single-player video games
Texas Instruments games
TI-99/4A games
Video games developed in the United States
Western (genre) video games